Buckholts is a town in Milam County, Texas, United States. Its population was 515 at the 2010 census. The town was founded in 1887, and had a movie theater and a hospital in the early 1920s, with a population around 1000 people.

Geography

Buckholts is located at  (30.873919, –97.125128).

Demographics

At the 2000 census, 387 people, 145 households, and 102 families were residing in the town. The population density was 291.7 people/sq mi (112.3/km2). The 166 housing units averaged 125.1/sq mi (48.2/km2). The racial makeup was 83.46% White, 1.81% African American, 0.52% Native American, 12.92% from other races, and 1.29% from two or more races. Hispanics or Latinos of any race were 35.66% of the population.

Of the 145 households,  32.4% had children under 18 living with them, 56.6% were married couples living together, 8.3% had a female householder with no husband present, and 29.0% were not families. About 26.2% of all households were made up of individuals, and 20.0% had someone living alone who was 65 or older. The average household size was 2.67, and the average family size was 3.24.

In the town, the age distribution was 28.2%  under 18, 8.8% from 18 to 24, 25.8% from 25 to 44, 18.1% from 45 to 64, and 19.1% at 65 or older. The median age was 35 years. For every 100 females, there were 90.6 males. For every 100 females age 18 and over, there were 95.8 males.

The median household income was $31,563 and the median family income was $36,875. Males had a median income of $31,458 and females $19,375. The per capita income was $13,102. About 16.8% of families and 17.1% of the population were below the poverty line, including 17.4% of those under age 18 and 23.3% of those age 65 or over.

Education
The town of Buckholts is served by the Buckholts Independent School District, the location of Buckholts High School.

References

External links

Towns in Milam County, Texas
Towns in Texas